Reality Z is a Brazilian horror web television series based on the British television miniseries Dead Set. Produced in partnership with Conspiração Filmes and directed by Cláudio Torres, the first season of 10 episodes premiered on Netflix on 10 June 2020.

Plot
The successful reality show Olympus – where TK, Jessica, Augusto, Marcos, Veronica, Madonna and Cleide were confined – is interrupted when a zombie apocalypse takes over Rio de Janeiro, forcing the production and the cast to remain locked up in the studios. A production runner, Nina, leads the fight against monsters.

Cast

Main
Ana Hartmann as Nina 
Emílio de Mello as Alberto Levi 
Carla Ribas as Ana Schmidt
Ravel Andrade as Leo Schmidt
Guilherme Weber as Brandão and the voice of Zeus 
Luellem de Castro as Teresa 
João Pedro Zappa as TK and Hermes
Hanna Romanazzi as Jessica and Aphrodite
Jesus Luz as Lucas 
Pierre Baitelli as Robson
Leandro Daniel as Augusto and Ares
Gabriel Canella as Marcos and Apollo 
Natália Rosa as Veronica and Athena
Wallie Ruy as Madonna and Dionysus
Arlinda Di Baio as Cleide and Demeter
Julia Ianina as Cristina

Special guest
 Sabrina Sato as Divina McCall
 Leda Nagle as Nora Werneck
 Cinnara Leal as Clara
 Erom Cordeiro as Marcelo
 Bruno Bellarmino as Tysson
 Saulo Arcoverde as Eric
 Thelmo Fernandes as Peixe
 Mariah de Moraes as Producer assistant
 André Dale as José Peixoto
 Charles Fricks as Dr. Fábio Lima

Episodes

Production

Development
On April 24, 2019, the series was announced by Charlie Brooker, creator of Dead Set on the Netflix panel at the 2019 Rio2C (Rio Creative Conference) event. A teaser with Ted Sarandos, Netflix's head of content, convincing presenter Sabrina Sato that there is no problem happening as the attraction was released on the same day on Netflix Brazil social medias to announce the series.

Casting
Alongside the initial series announcement, it was reported that actors Guilherme Weber, Jesus Luz, Ana Hartmann, Emilio de Mello, Carla Ribas, Luellem de Castro, Ravel Andrade, and Wallie Ruy would be part of the cast and Sabrina Sato as a special guest.

Soundtrack

 Pink Floyd - "Fat Old Sun"
 The Who - "Love, Reign o'er Me"
 The Velvet Underground - "After Hours"

References

External links 
 
 

2020 Brazilian television series debuts
2020s horror television series
Brazilian television series based on British television series
Horror comedy television series
Portuguese-language Netflix original programming
Reality television series parodies
Television shows set in Rio de Janeiro (city)
Zombies in television